is a Japanese light novel series written by Ishio Yamagata, with illustrations by Miyagi. Shueisha has published six volumes since August 2011. A manga adaptation by Kei Toru began serialization in Shueisha's Super Dash & Go! magazine in February 2012. Both the light novels and their manga adaptation are licensed in North America by Yen Press. An anime television series produced by Passione and directed by Takeo Takahashi aired in Japan from July 4 to September 19, 2015.

Plot
However, when they gather, there are seven heroes present, leading them to believe that one is an impostor and on the side of the Demon God. The landscape, architecture, and written language portrayed is very similar to Mesoamerican Maya or Aztec peoples.

Characters

Braves
 

The main protagonist. He is the self-proclaimed strongest man in the world. He fights using tools and trickery to catch his opponent off-guard. Teguneu appeared at his village when he was a child and destroyed it while capturing all the villagers except Adlet. His reason for wanting to become a Brave is revenge. Since he could not become a Saint (only women can become Saints) he went and found Altro, a hermit adept in various fighting styles and in science.

The first princess of Piena and the Saint of Blades. She can make blades appear out of nothing to use as projectiles. Her family was killed during a civil war in Piena.
 

A sniper known as the Six Flower Killer (Brave-Killer in anime) and the Saint of Gunpowder. She is a half-fiend who was betrayed by her mother and tribe after failing to kill Chamo, so she goes to kill the Demon God in revenge. She can create bullets and other explosives out of thin air. She loves dogs and hates humans, though it appears she has feelings for Adlet despite her denying it. Thanks to Adlet she was willing to accept the rest of the Braves as her comrades and they accepted her as well.

A strange assassin man who mimics a cat as he talks, as well as their movement. He fences with an unworldly and peculiar skill. He is the only one who believes that the Seventh is unaware of his own status, and suspects that Adlet is the Seventh. He is the first to find out that Adlet is not the Seventh (via using his assassin techniques) and does everything in his power to prove his innocence.
 

An extremely serious and intellectual woman. She serves as the leader of the Saints and is the Saint of Mountains. She initially suspected Adlet was the seventh even going so far as framing him for the crime of attacking Hans, which never actually happened. She is the only person Chamo will listen to. 
 

A proud little girl who is called the most powerful warrior of the current age. She is the Saint of Swamps. Every kyōma she has ever eaten lives in the swamp within her stomach. She vomits every time she uses them as weapons. She carries a small foxtail grass to help her do this. While she is powerful she often doesn't listen to others and will act on her own as she pleases.
 

A young knight completely devoted to Nashetania, he wields a giant spear. He was tasked to find the Six Flower Killer. He is jealous of Adlet's closeness to the Princess. Having been saved by Nashetania when he was little, he swore to protect her ever since.

A short girl who wears cow-themed armor and glasses. She is the Saint of Fresh Blood and a childhood friend of Adlet and is adept at healing magic. She arrived at the end of the first volume, bringing the number of the braves back to 7. She was initially just a servant who washed clothes at the temple of the God of Fresh Blood. When the saint before her died, she was chosen by the god rather than all the acolytes present. She wields a whip in battle that is filled with her blood. This allows her to control it completely and one scratch can force the blood out of any opponent it touches.

Kyōma

One of the three kyōma leaders. He is very manipulative and loves to read poems. He believes that 'love' is the ultimate weapon.

One of the three kyōma leaders. He takes the form of a lion and treats his fellow kyōma as his children.

One of the three kyōma leaders. He takes the form of a dog and can control lightning.

Media

Light novels
Rokka no Yūsha began as a light novel series written by Ishio Yamagata, with illustrations by Miyagi. Shueisha published the first novel on August 25, 2011 under their Super Dash Bunko imprint. With the introduction of Dash X Bunko on November 11, 2014, the fifth volume of the light novel was released. Six volumes have been released as of July 24, 2015. North American publisher Yen Press announced their license to the series at Anime Expo 2016. A spin-off volume titled Rokka no Yūsha Archive 1: Don't pray to the flower was released on March 25, 2016.

Manga
A manga adaptation, illustrated by Kei Toru, began serialization in Shueisha's Super Dash & Go! with the April 2012 issue sold on February 25. After the magazine ended its publication in print in April 2013, the manga continued serialization online until November 20, 2014. Four tankōbon volumes were published from October 25, 2012 to July 24, 2015. Yen Press announced their license to the manga adaptation at Anime Expo 2016 and released all volumes in 2017.

Anime
An anime television series adaptation of the first novel volume, produced by Passione and directed by Takeo Takahashi aired from July 4 to September 19, 2015. The series is licensed in North America by Ponycan USA and by Anime Limited in the UK. Five pieces of theme music were used for the episodes: two opening themes and three ending themes. From episodes 1-4 and 12, "Cry for the Truth" was used as the first opening theme, and from episodes 1-3, 8 and 12, "Secret Sky" was used as the first ending theme, both performed by Michi. The second opening theme "Black Swallowtail" by Uroboros was used from episodes 5-11, and the second ending theme used from episodes 4-5 and 10 is "Dance in the Fake" by Yoko Hikasa. From episodes 6-7, 9 and 11, "Nameless Heart" by Aoi Yūki was used as the third ending theme.

Reception
Stig Høgset from THEM Anime Reviews was intrigued by the overall mystery throughout the show, but felt it dragged viewers along with constant accusations towards the same character, "inconsistent" animation and underutilizing its Youma sentients.

References

External links
 
Rokka no Yūsha at Shueisha 

2010s fantasy novels
2011 Japanese novels
2015 anime television series debuts
Action anime and manga
Adventure anime and manga
Anime and manga based on light novels
Crunchyroll anime
Dash X Bunko
Fantasy anime and manga
Japanese fantasy novels
Light novels
Mystery anime and manga
Passione (company)
Shōnen manga
Shueisha manga
Super Dash Bunko
Television shows based on light novels
Yen Press titles